Alessandro Carosso (born 2 February 2002) is an Italian professional footballer who plays as a defender for  club Fermana on loan from Pro Vercelli.

Club career
On 19 January 2022, he joined Vibonese on loan.

On 24 August 2022, Carosso was loaned by Fermana.

Career statistics

Club

References

External links
 

2002 births
Living people
Italian footballers
Association football defenders
Serie C players
F.C. Pro Vercelli 1892 players
U.S. Vibonese Calcio players
Fermana F.C. players